Roger Davis Masters (born June 8, 1933) studied at Harvard (A.B. 1955, Summa cum Laude), served in the U.S. Army (1955–57) and completed his M.A. (1958) and Ph.D. (1961) at the University of Chicago. After teaching at Yale (1961–1967), he has been on the faculty at Dartmouth College (1967 to present) as well as Cultural Attaché at the American Embassy in Paris (1969–1971). He is currently the Nelson A. Rockefeller Professor of Government Emeritus and Research Professor in the Department of Government at Dartmouth.

Academic career
Roger Masters has made deep and wide-ranging contributions in social science. The central concern of his career has been how biological circumstances influence individual behavior and social outcomes.

Masters began his career in political philosophy as a student of Leo Strauss at the University of Chicago. His dissertation and subsequent book The Political Philosophy of Rousseau helped demonstrate the importance of Jean-Jacques Rousseau in modern thought. He translated and edited influential new editions of Rousseau's works (The First and Second Discourses and On the Social Contract, with the Geneva Manuscript and Political Economy), and later co-edited the only complete English edition of The Collected Writings of Rousseau. The role of natural science in early political thought is also addressed in his 1996 book, Machiavelli, Leonardo and the Science of Power, and his 1998 book, Fortune is a River: Leonardo da Vinci and Niccolò Machiavelli's Magnificent Dream to Change the Course of Florentine History.

Masters' investigation of how nature influences human societies led to significant contributions in the field of international relations, as well as human ethology and sociobiology. This work included pioneering laboratory experiments in political communication. Later, Masters' research on biology and human behavior led to new epidemiological evidence regarding the behavioral impacts of neurotoxins, first on the consequences of lead poisoning, and then on the links between a common method of water fluoridation to elevated blood lead and a higher prevalence of violent crime, substance abuse and learning disabilities.

Masters' work has pioneered the application of natural science discoveries to the social sciences and government policy. He was a founding member and serves on the Executive Council of the Association for Politics and the Life Sciences, and leads an ongoing consultancy on biology and politics for the U.S. Department of Defense in collaboration with anthropologist Lionel Tiger and neuroscientist Michael T. McGuire. He served on the 2006-07 "Get the Lead out of Vermont" task force, and is frequently consulted by other government agencies or activists concerned with the behavioral consequences of environmental toxins.

Published work

Principal books
 Masters, Roger D. (ed.), 1964. The First and Second Discourses by Jean-Jacques Rousseau, translated by Roger D Masters and Judith R Masters. New York: St. Martin's Press.
 Masters, Roger D. (ed.), 1967. The Nation is Burdened: American foreign policy in a changing world.  New York: Random House
 Masters, Roger D., 1968. The Political Philosophy of Rousseau. Princeton, N.J., Princeton University Press, also available in French.
 Masters, Roger D. (ed.), 1978. On the Social Contract, with the Geneva Manuscript and Political Economy by Jean-Jacques Rousseau, translated by Judith R Masters. New York: St Martin's Press.
 Masters, Roger D., 1989. The Nature of Politics. New Haven: Yale University Press.
 Masters, Roger D., 1993. Beyond Relativism: Science and Human Values. Hanover, NH: University Press of New England.
 Masters, Roger D., 1996. Machiavelli, Leonardo and the Science of Power. Notre Dame, IN: University of Notre Dame Press. See also NYT book review
 Masters, Roger D., 1998. Fortune is a River: Leonardo da Vinci and Niccolò Machiavelli's Magnificent Dream to Change the Course of Florentine History. New York: Simon & Schuster, also available in Chinese, Japanese, German, Portuguese, and Korean. See also NYT book review

Edited volumes
 Gruter, Margaret and Roger D. Masters, eds., 1984. Ostracism: A Social and Biological Phenomenon. http://www.bepress.com/gruterclassics/ostracism.
 Masters, Roger D. and Margaret Gruter, eds.,1992. The Sense of Justice: Biological Foundations of Law. Newbury Park, CA: Sage Publications.
 Masters, Roger D. and Michael T. McGuire, eds. 1994. The Neurotransmitter Revolution: Serotonin, Social Behavior, and the Law. Carbondale: Southern Illinois University Press.
 Masters, Roger D., Glendon A. Schubert and Albert Somit, eds., 1994. Primate Politics. Lanham, MD: University Press of America

Edited series
 Masters, Roger D. and Christopher Kelly, eds. (1990) The Collected Writings of Rousseau. Hanover, NH: University Press of New England (12 volumes, various years). Series includes:
 The Confessions and Correspondence, Including the Letters to Malesherbes
 Dialogues
 Autobiographical, Scientific, Religious, Moral, and Literary Writings
 Discourse on the Origins of Inequality (Second Discourse), Polemics, and Political Economy
 Discourse on the Sciences and Arts (First Discourse) and Polemics
 Essay on the Origin of Languages and Writings Related to Music
 Julie, or the New Heloise
 Letter to Beaumont, Letters Written from the Mountain, and Related Writings
 Letter to D'Alembert and Writings for the Theater
 The Plan for Perpetual Peace, On the Government of Poland, and Other Writings on History and Politics
 The Reveries of the Solitary Walker, Botanical Writings, and Letter to Franquières
 Social Contract, Discourse on the Virtue Most Necessary for a Hero, Political Fragments, and Geneva Manuscript

Principal articles and book chapters, by theme

International Relations
 Masters, Roger D. (1961), A Multi-Bloc Model of the International System. The American Political Science Review, Vol. 55, No. 4 (Dec.), pp. 780-798. 
 Masters, Roger D. (1964b), World Politics as a Primitive Political System. World Politics, Vol. 16, No. 4 (July), pp. 595-619. 

Political Theory
 Masters, Roger D. (1977), The Case of Aristotle's Missing Dialogues: Who Wrote the Sophist, the Statesman, and the Politics? Political Theory, Vol. 5, No. 1 (Feb.), pp. 31-60. 
 

Human Ethology and Sociobiology
 
 
 Masters, Roger D. (1982), Is Sociobiology Reactionary? The Political Implications of Inclusive-Fitness Theory. The Quarterly Review of Biology, Vol. 57, No. 3 (Sep.), pp. 275-292. 
 Masters, Roger D. (1983), The Biological Nature of the State. World Politics, Vol. 35, No. 2 (Jan.), pp. 161-193. 
 
 Masters, Roger D. (1990), Evolutionary Biology and Political Theory. The American Political Science Review, Vol. 84, No. 1 (March), pp. 195-210. 
 

Political Communication
 Masters, Roger D. (1981), Linking ethology and political science: Photographs, political attention, and presidential elections, in Meredith Watts, ed. Biopolitics: Ethological and physiological approaches. New York: Jossey-Bass.
 McHugo, Gregory J., Lanzetta, John T., Sullivan, Denis G., Masters, Roger D. and Englis, Basil G. (1985), Emotional Reactions to a Political Leader's Expressive Displays. Journal of Personality & Social Psychology. 49(6, December):1513-1529. 
 Roger D. Masters, Denis G. Sullivan, Alice Feola, Gregory J. McHugo (1987), Television Coverage of Candidates' Display Behavior during the 1984 Democratic Primaries in the United States, International Political Science Review. Vol. 8, No. 2, (April), pp. 121-130. 
 Newton, James S., Roger D. Masters, Gregory J. McHugo and Denis G. Sullivan (1987), Making up Our Minds: Effects of Network Coverage on Viewer Impressions of Leaders. Polity, Vol. 20, No. 2 (Winter), pp. 226-246. 
 Sullivan, Denis G., Roger D. Masters (1988), "Happy Warriors": Leaders' Facial Displays, Viewers' Emotions, and Political Support. American Journal of Political Science, Vol. 32, No. 2 (May), pp. 345-368. 
 Masters, Roger D., Denis G. Sullivan (1989), Nonverbal Displays and Political Leadership in France and the United States. Political Behavior, Vol. 11, No. 2 (June), pp. 123-156. 
 Masters, Roger D., Siegfried Frey, Gary Bente (1991), Dominance and Attention: Images of Leaders in German, French, & American TV News. Polity, Vol. 23, No. 3 (Spring, 1991), pp. 373-394. 
 Masters, Roger D. (1991), Individual and cultural differences in response to leaders' nonverbal displays. Journal of Social Issues, 47(3): 151-165. 
 
 
 

Neurotoxins and Behavior
 Masters, Roger D., with Baldwin Way, Brian T. Hone, David J. Grelotti, David Gonzalez, and David Jones (1997), Neurotoxicity and Violence, Vermont Law Review, 22:358-382.
 Masters, Roger D., Hone, Brian T., and Doshi, Anil. 1998. "Environmental Pollution, Neurotoxicity, and Criminal Violence," in J. Rose., ed., Environmental Toxicology: Current Developments (London: Taylor and Francis), pp. 13-48.
 

 
 Coplan, M.J. and R.D. Masters (2001), Guest Editorial: Silicofluorides and fluoridation. Fluoride. Volume 34, No. 3 (Aug): 161-164. 
 
 

Other
 Masters, Roger D. (2002) "Pre-Emptive War, Iraq, and Suicide Bombers," The Forum: Vol. 1 : Iss. 2, Article 3.

References

External links
http://www.dartmouth.edu/~rmasters
http://www.dartmouth.edu/~govt/faculty/masters.html

American political scientists
1933 births
American political philosophers
Dartmouth College faculty
Harvard University alumni
Living people
University of Chicago alumni
Yale University faculty